The Sunda Island tiger (Panthera tigris sondaica) is a tiger subspecies native to the Sunda Islands in Indonesia. The name refers to the:

 Javan tiger (P. t. sondaica) — the extinct tiger population of Java
 Bali tiger, formerly P. t. balica (Schwarz, 1912) — the extinct tiger population of Bali
 Sumatran tiger, formerly P. t. sumatrae (Pocock, 1929) — the living tiger population of Sumatra

See also 
 Bornean tiger
 Panthera tigris tigris

References 

Tiger subspecies